1-Nitronaphthalene is an organic compound with the formula C10H7NO2.  It is one of two isomers of nitronaphthalene.  A pale yellow, sublimable solid, 1-nitronaphthalene is the main product of the direct nitration of naphthalene.  It is an intermediate in the production of naphthylamine, a precursor to dyes.

Safety
Toxic.

References

Nitronaphthalenes
1-Naphthyl compounds